Pulvinula cinnabarina is a species of apothecial fungus belonging to the family Pyronemataceae. This is a European fungus of sandy soils, sometimes occurring at fire sites. The small (up to 1 cm across) orange, cushion-shaped ascocarps appear in summer and early autumn.

References

Pyronemataceae
Fungi described in 1874